Micah Shrewsberry (born July 31, 1976) is an American basketball coach and former college basketball player. He is the current head coach for the Penn State Nittany Lions of the Big Ten Conference.

Playing career
Shrewsberry attended Cathedral High School in Indianapolis, Indiana, and played collegiately at Hanover College where he was a three-year starter and tri-captain, while leading the league in free throw percentage and assists during the 1998–99 season.

Coaching career
After his playing career, Shrewsberry had assistant coaching stops at Wabash and DePauw before joining the coaching staff at Marshall for two seasons under Ron Jirsa. In 2005, he was named the head coach at Indiana University South Bend, where he served until 2007, when he joined Brad Stevens' staff at Butler. While with the Bulldogs, Shrewsberry was part of the program's back-to-back NCAA national runner-up squads.

In 2011, Shrewsberry would join Purdue's coaching staff where he was credited for helping lead the Purdue Boilermakers to 8.74 turnovers per game, a nation-leading effort. He'd reunite with Stevens in the NBA ranks, joining the Boston Celtics coaching staff, helping the Celtics to five playoff appearances, including back-to-back Eastern Conference Finals. On May 9, 2019, Shrewsberry returned to Purdue as an associate head coach.

Penn State
On March 15, 2021, Shrewsberry was named as head coach at Penn State, the 14th head coach in program history.

In just his second season coaching the Nittany Lions, Shrewsberry led the team to a 23-14 record, which saw it finish as runner-up to Purdue in the B1G Tournament and earn its first NCAA Tournament appearance since 2011, where it defeated Texas A&M in the First Round and narrowly lost to #2-seed Texas in the Round of 32, 71-66. The victory over Texas A&M was Penn State's first NCAA Tournament win since 2001. The team set a B1G record for most 3-pointers made in a season and star guard, Jalen Pickett, earned second team All-America honors, the first Nittany Lion to do so since 1954.

Personal life
Shrewsberry graduated from Cathedral High School. He earned a B.A. from Hanover College and a master's degree in sports management from Indiana State University.

Head coaching record

NCAA DI

He coached at an Indiana branch campus upon embarking on his journey as a coach.

References

External links

1976 births
Living people
American men's basketball players
Basketball coaches from Indiana
Basketball players from Indianapolis
Boston Celtics assistant coaches
Butler Bulldogs men's basketball coaches
College men's basketball head coaches in the United States
DePauw Tigers men's basketball coaches
Hanover Panthers men's basketball players
Indiana State University alumni
Point guards
Purdue Boilermakers men's basketball coaches
Wabash Little Giants basketball coaches